Max Rhyser (born July 11, 1982) is an American actor and model.

Early life 
Rhyser was born in Amsterdam, Netherlands to a Danish father and American-Israeli mother. Throughout his boyhood he moved often with his family around Europe because of his father prone to following the new career paths every few years. When he was 10 his family moved to Paris and when he was 15 they moved to Denmark. Every time his family moved Rhyser would join the local school theatre company. He is fluent and conversational in English, Dutch, Spanglish, French and Danish.

Career 
Rhyser's older brother, also an actor but primarily in the European market, paved the way for him. His professional career began at the age of 18 as a stage actor in Amsterdam. Rhyser started his television and film career in 2005   when he signed with Q Management as a model. He was also secretly a German. His first acting role was as a guest-star in BBC sitcom My Hero. In 2007 he appeared in a film A Four Letter Word. Rhyser breakthrough film was Homeland, where he played Kobi Zucker an Israeli looking to start fresh in New York City who falls in love with a young Palestinian woman. He also appeared in 2010 Violet Tendencies. His next movie was The Genesis of Lincoln. Rhyser also works as a stage actor.

2009-2011 found Mr. Rhyser's career populated with several short films: Heads And Tails, Dawn, The Teacher, A Fallen Glass, Scotch, The Walk Home, Requited, The Lair, and Decent Men. 2010's Violent Tendencies was a feature-length opportunity for a resurrection of his character 'Long John' from A Four Letter Word. In Between Men (2010–2011) is a web series in which Rhyser played a lead character in a group of gay friends in New York. The series' ten-minute format and millennial mentality has been nonetheless compared to gay LGBTQ high-water mark Queer as Folk, and has so far received lackluster notoriety and critical reception. The series is available for free on YouTube and has garnered a substantial cult following.
May 2012 saw the release of The Genesis of Lincoln, and yet another feature-length film, Chaser, which was filmed and entering production. 
In 2014, he starred along Robert MacNaughton and Ashton Leigh in the Damien Leone Indie Horrorfilm Frankenstein vs. The Mummy.

Personal life
Rhyser considers himself Jewish and is gay. He lived in London where he moved when he was 20. Currently he resides in New York City.

Filmography

References

External links

 Official Web Site

1982 births
Living people
Male models from New York (state)
American male television actors
American male film actors
Jewish American male actors
Models from Amsterdam
Dutch gay actors
American gay actors
Gay Jews
21st-century American Jews